Pryozerne is a village in the Izmail Raion (district) of the Odesa Oblast, Ukraine. It belongs to Suvorove settlement hromada, one of the hromadas of Ukraine. The population, composed of 1,788 people, is predominantly Moldovan (Romanian).

References

Notes

Sources
village Pryozerne Verkhovna rada website

Villages in Izmail Raion